Dease Strait is an east–west waterway between the mainland's Kent Peninsula and Victoria Island in Nunavut, Canada. It is part of the Northwest Passage.

The Strait is named after the Canadian explorer Peter Warren Dease, who was the first to navigate it along with the Scottish explorer Thomas Simpson.

References

External links
 Photo, 2002, Dease Strait freezing over

Straits of Kitikmeot Region
Victoria Island (Canada)